The 1936 United States Senate election in Iowa took place on November 3, 1936. Incumbent Republican Senator Lester J. Dickinson ran for re-election to a second term but was defeated by Democratic Governor Clyde Herring.

Republican primary

Candidates
Norman G. Baker, radio broadcaster
Smith W. Brookhart, former U.S. Senator (1922–26, 1927–33)
George Chaney
Lester J. Dickinson, incumbent Senator since 1931
Guy Linville
Edwin Manning

Results

Democratic primary

Candidates
Clyde Herring, Governor of Iowa
Hubert Utterback, U.S. Representative from Des Moines
Samuel D. Whiting

Results

Farmer-Labor primary

Candidates
George F. Buresh
Francis G. Cutler

Results

General election

Results

See also 
 1936 United States Senate elections

References 

1936
Iowa
United States Senate